The 2006 Colgate Raiders football team was an American football team that represented Colgate University during the 2006 NCAA Division I FCS football season. Colgate tied for fourth in the Patriot League. 

In its 11th season under head coach Dick Biddle, the team compiled a 4–7 record. Geoff Bean, Mike Saraceno and Jake Sulovski were the team captains. 

The Raiders outscored opponents 246 to 243. Their 3–3 conference record tied for fourth in the seven-team Patriot League standings.  

The team played its home games at Andy Kerr Stadium in Hamilton, New York.

Schedule

References

Colgate
Colgate Raiders football seasons
Colgate Raiders football